Spider Fighter is a fixed shooter designed by Larry Miller for the Atari 2600 and published by Activision in 1982. According to the manual, Miller was "the newest addition to the Activision design team." He went on to create the Atari 2600 racing game Enduro for Activision, released in 1983.

The object of Spider Fighter is to protect an orchard containing fruit—grapes, strawberries, oranges, and bananas—from four kinds of bugs. Digital Press described it as "much like the coin-op game Stratovox but w/o the voice."

Gameplay

In each level, the player must protect three pieces of fruit. The player's blaster moves left and right along the bottom of the screen, and the joystick button fires a shot upward toward four types of attackers. Each level contains a set number of "master nests", which are enemies who can grab a piece of fruit and drag it off the left side of the screen. A nest drops the fruit when shot. The game ends if all fruit has been stolen or all of the player's blasters are destroyed. The type of fruit varies per level: grapes, strawberries, oranges, and bananas.

There is an option to have the shots move horizontally with the blaster after being fired, allowing them to be steered.

At the time of release, a photo of the TV screen showing a score of 40,000 points or higher would earn the player a patch for the Activision "Spider Fighters."

Reception
Spider Fighter was not as successful as Activision's other fixed shooter released earlier the same year, Megamania.

Electronic Fun with Computers & Games gave the game 3 out 4 joysticks in the May 1983 issue. A June 1983 Electronic Games review was more critical, claiming it a "keen disappointment" and a "mediocre title from a superior game company." Joystik took the middle road, calling it "a better than average bottom-shoot game that somehow looks like it should be more difficult than it is."

In an AtariHQ retrospective review, Keita Iida said "2600 players who are familiar with Activision's usual efforts (which are exceptional overall) might feel a bit let down by Spider Fighter."

See also

Bandits

References

External links
Spider Fighter at Atari Mania

1983 TV commercial

1982 video games
Activision games
Atari 2600 games
Atari 2600-only games
Fixed shooters
Video games about food and drink
Video games about insects
Video games developed in the United States
Video games about spiders
Single-player video games